Ralph Asher Alpher (February 3, 1921 – August 12, 2007) was an American cosmologist, who carried out pioneering work in the early 1950s on the Big Bang model, including Big Bang nucleosynthesis and predictions of the cosmic microwave background radiation.

Childhood and education 
Alpher was the son of a Russian Empire Jewish immigrant, Samuel Alpher (born Alfirevich), from Vitebsk, Russian Empire. His mother, Rose Maleson, died of stomach cancer in 1938, and his father later remarried. Alpher graduated at age 15 from Theodore Roosevelt High School in Washington, D.C., and held the ranks of Major and Commander of his school's Cadet program. He worked in the high school theater as stage manager for two years, supplementing his family's Depression-era income. He also learned Gregg shorthand, and in 1937 began working for the Director of the American Geophysical Union as a stenographer. In 1940 he was hired by the Department of Terrestrial Magnetism of the Carnegie Foundation, where he worked with Dr. Scott Forbush under contract for the U.S. Navy to develop ship degaussing techniques during World War II. He contributed to the development of the Mark 32 and Mark 45 detonators, torpedoes, Naval gun control, Magnetic Airborne Detection (of submarines), and other top-secret ordnance work (including the Manhattan Project), and he was recognized at the end of the War with the Naval Ordnance Development Award (December 10, 1945—with Symbol), and another Naval Ordnance Development award in 1946. Alpher's war time work been somewhat obscured by security classification. From 1944 through 1955, he was employed by Johns Hopkins University at the Applied Physics Laboratory (APL). During the daytime he was involved in the development of ballistic missiles, guidance systems, supersonics, and related subjects. In 1948 he earned his Ph.D. in Physics with a theory of nucleosynthesis called neutron capture, and from 1948 onward collaborated with Dr. Robert C. Herman (Ph.D. in Physics, 1940, Princeton University, under E. Condon), also at APL, on predictions of the Cosmic Microwave Background Radiation (now widely referred to by the acronym CMB). Alpher was somewhat ambivalent about the nature of his ordnance work, having dedicated much of his early career to this in order to obtain his doctorate.

At age 16, he was offered a full scholarship to the Massachusetts Institute of Technology (MIT), but it may have been withdrawn after Alpher had a required meeting with an alumnus in Washington, D.C., with little explanation or clarification. Instead, he earned his bachelor's degree and advanced graduate degrees in physics from George Washington University, all the while working as a physicist on contract to the Navy, and eventually for the Johns Hopkins University APL. He met Russian-Ukrainian physicist George Gamow at the University, who subsequently took him on as his doctoral student. This was somewhat of a coup, as Gamow was a prominent Soviet defector and one of the luminaries on the GWU faculty. His first physics course was taught by Edward Teller, brought onto the GWU faculty in 1935 to give Gamow a peer on the faculty. Alpher provided much needed mathematical ability to support Gamow's theorizing. Gamow often gave talks across the world on "The Origin of the Elements", which was Alpher's original dissertation.  Gamow continues to be credited with Alpher's work on nucleosynthesis.  Alpher followed his dissertation immediately  with the first prediction of the existence of "fossil" radiation from a hypothetical singularity—the Cosmic Microwave Background Radiation. This was observationally confirmed by Arno Allan Penzias and Robert Wilson at Bell Labs using a horn radiotelescope.  Further research has shown other observations made, but not interpreted cosmologically.  They were awarded the Nobel Prize in Physics for the observation in 1978.  Ironically a group at Princeton was given credit for making a cosmological interpretation in an inflationary universe (Big Bang) in a companion publication in 1965 to Penzias and Wilson, which is incorrect.

While attending GWU, Alpher met Louise Ellen Simons, who was majoring in psychology at night school and working as a day secretary with the State Department. Nearly two months after the attack on Pearl Harbor, Alpher and Louise were married. At this time he had already done classified work for the U.S. Navy through the Carnegie Institution for nearly one and a half years. During a hiatus in his scientific work in early 1944, he did apply to the Navy for a commission, for which he was eligible. By this time he had done so much classified and secret work he was no longer subject to the draft (along with about 7,000 others), and prohibited from enlistment. That summer, he signed on to APL at Johns Hopkins University to work on another classified project—a new magnetic-influence torpedo exploder. This was badly needed since the Mark 14 torpedo, which had a poorly tested exploder that had its magnetic component turned off by order of the Chief of Naval Operations in late 1943, was badly in need of replacement (V.S. Alpher, The Submarine Review, October, 2009).

Big Bang nucleosynthesis theory 
Alpher's dissertation in 1948 dealt with a subject that came to be known as Big Bang nucleosynthesis. Nucleosynthesis is the explanation of how more complex elements are created out of simple elements in the moments following the Big Bang. Right after the Big Bang, when the temperature was extremely high, if any nuclear particles, such as neutrons and protons, became bound together (being held together by the attractive nuclear force) they would be immediately broken apart by the high energy photons (quanta of light) present in high density. In other words, at this extremely high temperature, the photons' kinetic energy would overwhelm the binding energy of the strong nuclear force. For example, if a proton and a neutron became bound together (forming deuterium), it would be immediately broken apart by a high energy photon. However, as time progressed, the universe expanded and cooled and the average energy of the photons decreased. At some point, roughly one second after the Big Bang, the attractive force of nuclear attraction would begin to win out over the lower energy photons and neutrons and protons would begin to form stable deuterium nuclei. As the universe continued to expand and cool, additional nuclear particles would bind with these light nuclei, building up heavier elements such as helium, etc.

Alpher argued that the Big Bang would create hydrogen, helium and heavier elements in the correct proportions to explain their abundance in the early universe. Alpher and Gamow's theory originally proposed that all atomic nuclei are produced by the successive capture of neutrons, one mass unit at a time. However, later studies challenged the universality of the successive capture theory, since no element was found to have a stable isotope with an atomic mass of five or eight, hindering the production of elements beyond helium.  It was eventually recognized that most of the heavy elements observed in the present universe are the result of stellar nucleosynthesis in stars, a theory largely developed by Hans Bethe, William Fowler and Subrahmanyan Chandrasekhar.  Bethe had been a last minute addition to Alpher's dissertation examining committee.

Since Alpher's dissertation was perceived to be ground-breaking, over 300 people attended the dissertation defense, including the press, and articles about his predictions and a Herblock cartoon appeared in major newspapers. This was quite unusual for a doctoral dissertation.

Later the same year, collaborating with Robert Herman, Alpher predicted the temperature of the residual radiation known as cosmic microwave background radiation resulting from the hypothesized Big Bang. However, Alpher's predictions concerning the cosmic background radiation were more or less forgotten until they were rediscovered by Robert Dicke and Yakov Zel'dovich in the early 1960s. The existence of the cosmic background radiation and its temperature were measured experimentally in 1964 by two physicists working for Bell Laboratories in New Jersey, Arno Penzias and Robert Wilson, who were awarded the Nobel Prize in Physics for this work in 1978.

 Elements of Alpher's independent dissertation were first published on April 1, 1948 in the Physical Review with three authors: Alpher, Hans Bethe and Gamow. Although his name appears on the paper, Bethe had no direct part in the development of the theory, although he later worked on related topics; Gamow added his name to make the author list Alpher, Bethe, Gamow, a pun on alpha, beta, gamma (α, β, γ), the first three letters of the Greek alphabet.  Gamow joked that "There was, however, a rumor that later, when the alpha, beta, gamma theory went temporarily on the rocks, Bethe seriously considered changing his name to Zacharias". When referring to Robert Herman he wrote: "R. C. Herman, who stubbornly refuses to change his name to Delter."  Alpher worried that the humor engendered by Gamow may have obscured his own critical role in developing the theory.  With the award of the 2005 National Medal of Science, Alpher's original work on nucleosynthesis and the cosmic microwave background radiation prediction was recognised. Neil deGrasse Tyson was instrumental in a NSF committee recommendation (personal communication to Dr. Victor S. Alpher, July 26, 2007).

Alpher and Robert Herman were awarded the Henry Draper Medal from the National Academy of Sciences in 1993. They were also awarded the Magellanic Premium of the American Philosophical Society in 1975, the Georges Vanderlinden Physics prize of the Belgian Academy of Sciences, as well as significant awards of the New York Academy of Sciences and the Franklin Institute of Philadelphia. Two Nobel Prizes in physics have been awarded for empirical work related to the cosmic background radiation — in 1978 to Arno Penzias and Robert Wilson and in 2006 to John Mather and George Smoot. Alpher and Herman (the latter, posthumously) published their own account of their work in cosmology in 2001, Genesis of the Big Bang (Oxford University Press).  Published as a trade book, it received little promotion or sales in the first edition.

He was elected a Fellow of the American Academy of Arts and Sciences in 1986. In 2005 Alpher was awarded the National Medal of Science. The citation for the award reads "For his unprecedented work in the areas of nucleosynthesis, for the prediction that universe expansion leaves behind background radiation, and for providing the model for the Big Bang theory." The medal was presented to his son, Dr. Victor S. Alpher, on July 27, 2007 by President George W. Bush, as his father could not travel to receive the award.

Later career 
In 1955 Alpher moved to a position with the General Electric Company's Research and Development Center. His primary role in his early years there was working on problems of vehicle re-entry from space. During the late 1940s at the APL at Johns Hopkins University, he worked as a member of John van Allen's work group, studying cosmic rays with high altitude balloons.  In 1955, both Alpher and Herman applied for positions at Iowa, where van Allen was now department chair, however, the salaries in academia were simply too low by comparison with industrial pay.  Alpher also continued to collaborate with Robert Herman, who had moved to the General Motors Research Laboratory, on problems in cosmology. The Cosmic Microwave Background Radiation was finally confirmed in 1964, although in retrospect many other astronomers and radio astronomers probably observed it without recognizing the cosmological significance.

From 1987 to 2004 he served as distinguished research professor of physics and astronomy at Union College in Schenectady, New York, during which time he was able to return to research and teaching. During all this time he continued to publish major peer-reviewed scientific papers and was active in community service for Public Broadcasting. Alpher was also (1987–2004) director of The Dudley Observatory.

In 1986 he was recognized with the Distinguished Alumnus Achievement Award of the George Washington University. All of his degrees were achieved by studying at night, whilst working for the Navy and Johns Hopkins APL during the daytime. In 2004 he joined the emeritus faculty at Union and was emeritus director of Dudley. He also received honorary Doctor of Science degrees from Union College and the Rensselaer Polytechnic Institute. From 2005 until his death, he remained emeritus director of the Dudley Observatory and emeritus distinguished professor of physics and astronomy at Union College.

Alpher's approach to science 
Alpher told Joseph D'Agnese in his interview for Discover Magazine, "There are two reasons you do science. One is the altruistic feeling that maybe you can contribute to mankind's store of knowledge about the world. The other and more personal thing is you want the approbation of your peers. Pure and simple."

Ralph Alpher told his son Victor in 1980, when considering advanced education, that approbation of anyone was not the reason to pursue graduate study or a career requiring advanced intensive study. Rather, he said to Victor, "you must enjoy and find satisfaction in the work you do every day, because you will not receive frequent rewards or pats on the back." Up to that time, he had received only three awards for his work in cosmology, from the American Philosophical Society, the Belgian Academy of Science, and the Franklin Institute—all occurring after he turned 50.

Personal life and views 
Despite raising a Jewish family Alpher considered himself to be agnostic and humanist. Alpher was a beloved husband and father.  He was married to Louise Alpher, had two children named Victor Seth and Harriet Rose and two grandchildren Lisa and Rachel Lebetkin.

Ralph Alpher died following an extended illness on August 12, 2007. He had been in failing health since falling and breaking his hip in February 2007.

See also 
 List of Jewish American physicists
 Nobel Prize controversies

References

External links 
 Website about Alpher maintained by his son Victor S. Alpher, Ph.D
 "On the Origin and Relative Abundance of the Elements," Doctoral Dissertation, George Washington University, May, 1948. Although discouraged from an academic career in Chemistry because of his Jewish ancestry, this continuing interest is reflected in 1) subject matter for his dissertation, and 2) subsequent research conducted as a full-time employee at the Applied Physics Laboratory at Johns Hopkins University.
 Newspaper review of Big Bang book citing Alpher as major contributor to Big Bang theory
 Article about Alpher's life in a 1999 Discover magazine.
 Oral History interview transcript for Ralph Alpher on 11 August 1983, American Institute of Physics, Niels Bohr Library and Archives
 Oral History interview transcript for Ralph Alpher and Robert Herman on 12 August 1983, American Institute of Physics, Niels Bohr Library and Archives
 Obituary in the Washington Post
 Obituary in the Albany (NY) Times-Union
 Obituary in the (London/UK) Daily Telegraph
 Discussion of Alpher's role
 Additional discussion of Alpher's role
 ArnoPenzia's 1978 Nobel prize lecture
 

1921 births
2007 deaths
American agnostics
American astronomers
American humanists
20th-century American physicists
American cosmologists
Fellows of the American Academy of Arts and Sciences
Jewish agnostics
Jewish American scientists
Johns Hopkins University people
National Medal of Science laureates
Scientists from Schenectady, New York
American people of Belarusian-Jewish descent
Columbian College of Arts and Sciences alumni
Jewish astronomers
George Washington University alumni